Old Gods is the tenth studio album by New Zealand alternative rock band Shihad, released on 8 October 2021. The album debuted at number one in New Zealand.

Production

Much of the album was inspired by Jon Toogood's experiences after his conversion to Islam, before his marriage to Dana Salih in Sudan in 2014, and the band's disgust at the rise of Conservative politicians in the world. The song "Little Demons" was one of the first songs written for the album, inspired by a televised Australian political debate where a Liberal Party of Australia told an Aboriginal Australian woman to call the police when she experiences racist threats.

Release and promotion

The album was announced on 8 July 2021, at the same time when the first single from Old Gods was released, "Tear Down Those Names". This was followed by "Little Demons" on 30 July, "Feel the Fire" in August and "Empire Falling" on 7 October.

The album was originally slated for release on 27 August, however the album was postponed due to the 2021 COVID-19 lockdowns in New Zealand, eventually released on 8 October.

The album debuted at number one in New Zealand, scoring the band the record for New Zealand band with the most number one albums in history.

The band intended to tour the album in Australia with a seven-date tour in October, and a planned five date tour of New Zealand in November, however both were cancelled due to COVID-19 restrictions in the countries. Shihad held their This Is the Sound of an Empire Falling tour in New Zealand, performing four dates in September and October 2022.

Track listing

Credits and personnel
 Tom Baker – mastering
 Karl Kippenberger – bass, songwriting
 Phil Knight – guitar, songwriting
 Tom Larkin – drums, songwriting
 Shihad – programming
 Adam Spark – mixing, producer
 Jon Toogood – guitar, songwriting

Charts

Weekly charts

Year-end charts

References

2021 albums
Shihad albums